Old Rectory of St. Stephen's Episcopal Church is a historic Episcopal church rectory located near Perrowville, Bedford County, Virginia.  It was built in 1787, and is a "T"-shaped frame dwelling with exterior end chimneys and a gable roof.  It features a modern one bay, two-story portico supported by four fluted Doric order columns.  From around 1828 to 1904, the house served as the rectory of St. Stephen's Episcopal Church.

It was listed on the National Register of Historic Places in 1973.

References

Houses completed in 1787
Houses in Bedford County, Virginia
Houses on the National Register of Historic Places in Virginia
National Register of Historic Places in Bedford County, Virginia
1787 establishments in Virginia
Clergy houses in the United States